The Urban Development Institute of Australia (UDIA) is an Australian research and non-profit organisation with offices in Queensland, New South Wales, Victoria, Western Australia, South Australia, Northern Territory and Australian Capital Territory. It claims to be the housing development industry’s most broad representative with more than 4,500 member companies: global enterprises, consultants to local governments and small-scale developers who inform and define the state-representative National Council. The organisation engages with Federal, State and Local Governments and their agencies on issues critical to the industry – covering tax, population, infrastructure, land use planning and beyond.

References

External links
 

Urban development in Australia
Business organisations based in Australia